Alaqush Tegin Quri or Alaqush Digit Quri (? - d. 1211) was a tribal leader of Onguds and a contemporary of Genghis Khan.

Biography 
He was Nestorian ruler of Turkic ancestry who is first remembered by sources when he was approached by Nayman prince Tayang Khan in 1203, who shared same cultural and religious backgrounds with him. While Naimans were negotiating for a possible alliance against Temujin, Alaqush secretly sent a messenger named Johannan to him, informing them of brewing troubles. Tayang Khan soon killed in 1204 and Alaqush Tegin formed an alliance with Genghis, pledging loyalty to him and receiving the hand of Genghis' daughter Alakhai Bekhi for his son Buyan Shiban in return in 1207.

During the Mongol invasion of Northern China, Alaqush assisted Genghis Khan by handing over the passage through the Great Wall of China that he was guarding during his service to Jin Dynasty. However, later Öngüds revolted against Genghis Khan in 1211 and killed both Alaqush and his son. Having suppressed the uprising eventually, Genghis Khan intended to execute all Ongud men taller than the cart axle, but was dissuaded by Alaqush's nephew Shigü and Alakhai, thus, only the instigators of the murder were executed along with their families. Alakhai subsequently married Shigü.

Alaqush was posthumously awarded the title King of Gaotang (高唐王) by Emperor Chengzong of Yuan in 1305.

Family 
Descendants of Alaqush continued to intermarry with Borjigin family and retained special status within the empire for generations:

 Buyan Shiban (d. 1211) - married Alakhai Bekhi
 Bayaohe - m. Alakhai in 1225 in levirate marriage
 Kün Buqa (君不花), Prince Zhongxiang - m. Yelmish Khatun (叶里迷失), daughter of Güyük Khan; died during Mongol invasion of Song
 Nanqiadai, Prince Zhonglie (忠烈王) - m. Princess Yilianzhen of Borjigin
 Kölinček, Prince Zhao Kangxi - m. Princess Uyghur (Huihe, 回鹘公主), granddaughter of Büri
 Antong
 Ay Buqa (愛不花) - m. Grand Princess of Zhao, Yuelie (赵国大長公主), daughter of Kublai Khan
 George (Körgis, 闊里吉思), Prince of Gaotang - m. Senior Princess of Qi, Qutadmish, daughter of Zhenjin, later Princess Zhao, daughter of Temür Khan; d. 1298
 John (Shùān, 朮安) - m. Aratnabala, daughter of Gammala (1263-1302), son of Zhenjin
 Esen Qaymish (died young)
 Johannan (Shùhūnán, 朮忽難), Prince of Gaotang - 1st m. Princess Yemian'ganzhen, daughter of Prince Qurudai (grandson of Khülgen, 6th son of Genghis Khan), 2nd m. Princess Ashituluhu, daughter of Naila Buqa (grandson of Darmabala)
 Aribadai - m. Princess Nulun, daughter of Prince Wangze of Wei, great-grandson of Möngke Khan
 Princess Bizhaxia - m. Gammala 
 Princess Yeliwan - m. Altan Buqa, son of Manggala
 Princess Qutluq - m. Ebügen, son of Qurudai
 Yer Buqa (拙里不花) - Governor of Yunnan
 Constance (Quštanz, 火思丹) - married to Princess Zhuhuzhen, son of Prince Buluochu (Ögedei's great-grandson)

References 

13th-century Mongol rulers
Nestorians
1211 deaths